The 1976–77 snooker season was a series of snooker tournaments played between September 1976 and May 1977. The following table outlines the results for the ranking and the invitational events.


Calendar

Official rankings 

The top 16 of the world rankings.

Notes

References

External links 
 

1976
Season 1977
Season 1976